Amozoc de Mota is a city located in Puebla, Mexico.  Its borders are in the north, the Malintzin volcano; in the south, the "Sierra de Amozoc"; in the west, the Acajete municipal seat; and in the west, the capital of the State Puebla city. Amozoc city is the seventh largest in the State, of Puebla, with a 2005 census population of 60,517 inhabitants.

While a small city, it has gained international relevance because it is the home of the Autódromo Miguel E. Abed, which hosts a World Touring Car Championship event.

References 
 Link to tables of population data from Census of 2005 – INEGI: Instituto Nacional de Estadística, Geografía e Informática
 Puebla – Enciclopedia de los Municipios de México

External links 
 Portal de Amozoc
 Presidencia Municipal de Amozoc – Official website of Municipality of Amozoc

Populated places in Puebla